Nallavan may refer to:
Nallavan (1955 film), a Tamil film released in 1955
Nallavan (1988 film), a Tamil film released in 1988
Nallavan (2010 film), a Malayalam film released in 2010